Tomáš Přikryl (born 4 July 1992) is a Czech professional footballer who plays as a winger for Jagiellonia Białystok.

References

External links
 
 
 
 

Living people
1992 births
Czech footballers
Czech expatriate footballers
Czech Republic youth international footballers
Czech Republic under-21 international footballers
Czech First League players
Ekstraklasa players
SK Sigma Olomouc players
AC Sparta Prague players
FK Dukla Prague players
FK Mladá Boleslav players
Jagiellonia Białystok players
Expatriate footballers in Poland
Association football wingers
Association football forwards
Sportspeople from Olomouc
Czech expatriate sportspeople in Poland